Young Exceptional Children is a quarterly peer-reviewed academic journal covering the field of special education. The editor-in-chief is Rosa Milagros Santos (University of Illinois). It was established in 1997 and is currently published by SAGE Publications in association with the Division for Early Childhood of the Council for Exceptional Children.

Abstracting and indexing 
Young Exceptional Children is abstracted and indexed in:
 Contents Pages in Education
 ERIC
 NISC
 Scopus

External links 
 
 Division for Early Childhood of the Council for Exceptional Children

SAGE Publishing academic journals
English-language journals
Special education journals
Quarterly journals
Publications established in 1997